The 2009-10 V-League season was the 6th season of the V-League, the highest professional volleyball league in South Korea. The season started on 1 November 2009 and finished on 19 April 2010. Daejeon Samsung Bluefangs were the defending champions in the men's league and Cheonan Heungkuk Pink Spiders the defending female champions.

Teams

Men's clubs

Women's clubs

Regular season

League table (Male)

League table (Female)

Play-offs

Bracket (Male)

Bracket (Female)

Top Scorers

Men's

Women's

Player of the Round

Men's

Women's

Final standing

Men's League

Women's League

References

External links
 Official website 

2009 in volleyball
2010 in volleyball
V-League (South Korea)